Martin Stranzl (born 16 June 1980) is an Austrian professional football coach and a former player who played as a defender.

Club career
Born in Güssing, Stranzl played for SV Güssing as a youth. In 1997, he earned a transfer to TSV 1860 Munich, where he completed his youth training and debuted as a Bundesliga professional. In 2004, following TSV's relegation, the defender joined first-division team VfB Stuttgart, where he remained a cornerstone.

In March 2006, Stranzl signed for Russian Premier League side Spartak Moscow. With Spartak Moscow, he finished three times as runner-up in the Russian Premier League.

On 30 December 2010, Stranzl agreed to terms with Borussia Mönchengladbach on a -year deal.  He helped the side avoid relegation.  At the time of his signing, Borussia Mönchenglabach was last in the Bundesliga.

On 8 March 2016, he announced that he would retire in summer 2016.

International career
He made his debut for Austria in a March 2000 friendly match against Sweden and was named in the Austrian squad for UEFA Euro 2008.

Career statistics

References

External links
 Martin Stranzl at borussia.de 
 Martin Stranzl Interview

1980 births
Living people
People from Güssing
Footballers from Burgenland
Austrian footballers
Austria international footballers
Association football defenders
UEFA Euro 2008 players
Bundesliga players
Russian Premier League players
Borussia Mönchengladbach players
TSV 1860 Munich players
VfB Stuttgart players
FC Spartak Moscow players
Austrian expatriate footballers
Austrian expatriate sportspeople in Germany
Expatriate footballers in Germany
Austrian expatriate sportspeople in Russia
Expatriate footballers in Russia
Austrian football managers